Vancouver-False Creek is a provincial electoral district in British Columbia, Canada. The current MLA is Brenda Bailey of the BC NDP. Established by the Electoral Districts Act, 2008, Vancouver-False Creek was first contested in the 2009 British Columbia general election.

The riding takes in most of Downtown Vancouver (the eastern part of Downtown is part of the Vancouver-Mount Pleasant riding) and the area around the north shore of False Creek, including Yaletown.

Members of the Legislative Assembly
This riding has elected the following Members of Legislative Assembly:

Election results

Student Vote results 
Student Vote Canada is a non-partisan program in Canada that holds mock elections in elementary and high schools alongside general elections (with the same candidates and same electoral system).

References

British Columbia provincial electoral districts
Politics of Vancouver
Provincial electoral districts in Greater Vancouver and the Fraser Valley